Choeradodis strumaria, common names leaf mantis and hooded mantis, is a species of praying mantis native to French Guiana, and neighboring countries, such as Suriname.

Description

The hooded mantis is also called the leaf mantis or leaf-mimic mantis because it mimics leaves. Like most other mantids, it is an ambush predator. C. strumaria is a chlorophyll-green colour and has a uniquely shaped hood; its wings have leaf-like veins that add to its perfect camouflage. It also has colorful patterns on the underside of its prothorax.

In captivity
This species is rare in captivity in the United States. The Choeradodis species are not commonly kept there, but can be found nearer their native range if one's eyes are sharp enough to see past their impressive camouflage. Some people collect them as wild specimens.

See also

List of mantis genera and species

References

Mantidae
Mantodea of South America
Insects described in 1758
Taxa named by Carl Linnaeus